The Forest is a historical novel by Edward Rutherfurd, published in 2000. Drawing on the success of Rutherfurd's other epic novels this went on to sell well and appeared in numbers of bestseller lists.

Plot summary
Set in the New Forest of southern England, this novel covers the lives of number of families tracing their history from the Saxons and Normans in 1099 through  a "Jane Austen" style world of the early 19th century to present. Story and characters combine to reveal and decorate the narrative in an important region in England not often used by writers.

Reception
"As entertaining as Sarum and Rutherfurd's other sweeping novel of British history, London." —Boston Globe

"The Forest is Michener told with an English accent." —St. Louis Post-Dispatch 

"As literature, Edward Rutherfurd's historical novels are not successful. They judder slowly along ill-made roads, like carts with square wheels, and the beauty of the scenery through which they pass does not entirely distract the passenger's mind from his aching bottom and tired eyes. As vehicles for delivering the fruits of research, however, they are not only efficient, but might truly be called works of art." - The Independent

Publication details
2000, UK, Century, pub date 6 April 2000, hardback (First edition)
2000, USA, Crown Pub, pub date ? April 2000, hardback
2001, UK, Arrow Books, pub date 5 April 2001, paperback
2001, USA, Ballantine Books, pub date ? July 2001, paperback

Footnotes

References

2000 British novels
Novels by Edward Rutherfurd
Historical novels
Novels set in England
Novels set in Hampshire
New Forest